Artiwara Kongmalai, or nickname Toon (born 30 May 1979), is a Thai rock music singer and vocalist from the Thai popular music band Bodyslam.

Early life and career
He was born on 30 May 1979. He is the nephew of Aed Carabao. He finished his secondary education at Suankularb Wittayalai School, and third degree from Chulalongkorn University.

He started his music career on stage in 1996 in the music contest "Hot Wave Music Awards", and signed-on with the recording label Music Bucks, until 2002 when he joined Thanadol Changsawek and Nathaphol Phannachet and founded the rock band Bodyslam, signed with the recording label GMM Grammy.
He had a platonic relationship with Rachawin Wongweeriya.

Charities
He founded a running project Gaw Khon La Gaw (Each step each), to run and donate money to hospitals in Thailand to buy medical equipment.
 In 2016 he raised money for the Bang Saphan Hospital, donating 85 million Baht.
 In 2018, he raised money for 11 hospitals in Thailand, donating 700 million to billion Baht.

Discography

Collaborations
 2000 – Sak Eoai (with Big Ass)
 2003 – Khong Mee Khom (with Big Ass)
 2010 – Kid Hoad (with Siriporn Ampaipong)
 2017 – Nak Phajon Mueng (with Mike Phiromphon, Phai Phongsathon and Tai Orathai)

Practical songs
 2010 – Saeng Sud Thay
 2013 – Ruea Lek Kuan Oak Jark Fang

Filmography
 2011 – SuckSeed

Commercials and endorsements
 Coffee Birdy
 Lod Wan La Thung Khun Tham Day by 7-Eleven in Thailand.
 M-150

Master of Ceremony: MC

References

1979 births
Living people
Artiwara Kongmalai
Artiwara Kongmalai
Artiwara Kongmalai
Artiwara Kongmalai
Artiwara Kongmalai